In 1789 is made the Declaration of the Rights of Man and of the Citizen, set by France's National Constituent Assembly.  In 1791, the enslaved Africans of Saint-Domingue began the Haitian Revolution, aimed at the overthrow of the colonial regime.

Background

Arawak and Taino people inhabited for more than one thousand years what was later known as Hispaniola. Christopher Columbus arrived to the island on December 5, 1492. The name Haiti (or Hayti) comes from the indigenous Taíno language which was the native name given to the entire island of Hispaniola to mean, "land of high mountains." Saint-Domingue became a French colony from 1659 to 1804 on the Caribbean island of Hispaniola.

Early attempts were made by slaves in order to recover their freedom, among them can be named the uprising in Saint-Domingue made by Padrejean in 1676, and the uprising of François Mackandal in 1757

In France was taking place the French Revolution, on 21 June 1791, King Louis XVI attempted to flee secretly with his family but his plan failed due to a series of misadventures, delays, misinterpretations, and poor judgments. Louis was officially arrested on 13 August 1792 and sent to the Temple, an ancient fortress in Paris that was used as a prison. On 21 September, the National Assembly declared France to be a republic, and abolished the monarchy. Louis was stripped of all of his titles and honors, and from this date was known as Citoyen Louis Capet.

1791 slave rebellion

News of the 1789 Declaration of the Rights of Man and of the Citizen were received by the Hispaniola citizens and prompted the reclamation of their rights.

On the night of August 14, 1791, representative slaves from nearby plantations of Le Cap gathered to participate in a secret ceremony conducted in the woods in the French colony of Saint-Domingue, during the ceremony Dutty Boukman and priestess Cécile Fatiman prophesied that Georges Biassou, Jeannot, Jean-François Papillon would lead the revolution, months later they killed the plantation owners to whom they were enslaved.

Haitian Revolution

Many generals fought in the Haitian revolution, some of they were Macaya, François Capois, Jean-Baptiste Belley, Magloire Ambroise, Nicolas Geffrard (general)
, and Étienne Élie Gerin, some of the battles of the revolution were: 

 Battle of Croix-des-Bouquets (22 March 1792),
 Siege of Port-au-Prince (12–14 April 1793),

Étienne Maynaud de Bizefranc de Laveaux was the French Governor of Saint-Domingue 13 June 1793 – 11 May 1796. The French government's decree of 16 Pluviôse an II (4 February 1794) freed the slaves, and news of this historic event reached Saint-Domingue in May 1794.Laveaux ensured that the law that freed the slaves was enforced, and supported the black leader Toussaint Louverture.

 Battle of Cap-Français (1793) (20–22 June 1793). 
 Battle of the Acul (19 February 1794),
 Battle of Saint-Raphaël (20–21 March 1794),
 Battle of Gonaïves (29 April–5 May 1794),
 War of Knives (1799 to 1800): It was a civil war from June 1799 to July 1800 between the Haitian revolutionary Toussaint Louverture, a black ex-slave who controlled the north of Saint-Domingue (modern-day Haiti), and his adversary André Rigaud, a mixed-race free person of color who controlled the south. Louverture and Rigaud fought over de facto control of the French colony of Saint-Domingue during the war.
 Battle of Ravine-à-Couleuvres (23 February 1802)
 Battle of Crête-à-Pierrot (4 March - 24 March 1802),
 Blockade of Saint-Domingue (18 June – 6 December 1803),
 Action of 28 June 1803
 Battle of Vertières (18 November 1803)

Haitian Declaration of Independence

The Haitian Declaration of Independence was proclaimed on 1 January 1804 in the port city of Gonaïves by Jean-Jacques Dessalines, marking the end of 13-year long Haitian Revolution. The declaration marked Haiti's becoming the first independent Black nation in the Western Hemisphere.

Jean-Jacques Dessalines became the first ruler of an independent Haiti under the 1805 constitution, the Governor-General of Haiti from 1 January 1804 to 2 September 1804, and the Emperor of Haiti from 	2 September 1804 to 17 October 1806.

See also

 United States and the Haitian Revolution
 Armée Indigène
 Armistice of March 30, 1798
 End of slavery in Haiti

References

Slavery in Haiti
History of Haiti
Human rights abuses in Haiti
Reparations for slavery